Berezivka is an urban-type settlement in Kharkiv Raion of Kharkiv Oblast in Ukraine. Berezivka belongs to Pisochyn settlement hromada, one of the hromadas of Ukraine. Population:

Economy

Transportation
The closest railway station is Budy on the railway connecting Liubotyn and Merefa. There is infrequent passenger traffic.

The settlement is included in the road network of Kharkiv urban agglomeration.

References

Urban-type settlements in Kharkiv Raion